The West Main Street Historic District encompasses a late 19th and early 20th century commercial area of Charlottesville, Virginia, developed during the area's growth as a streetcar suburb.  It is basically linear in character, extending along West Main Street from Ridge Street in the east to the railroad crossing west of 8th Street in the west.  The oldest building in the district is the c. 1820 Inge's Store, and the district includes the city's memorial to Meriwether Lewis and William Clark.

The district was listed on the National Register of Historic Places in 2017.

See also
National Register of Historic Places listings in Charlottesville, Virginia

References

Historic districts on the National Register of Historic Places in Virginia
Buildings and structures in Charlottesville, Virginia
National Register of Historic Places in Charlottesville, Virginia